The 1953 WANFL season was the 69th season of senior football in Perth, Western Australia.

Ladder

Grand final

References

West Australian Football League seasons
WANFL